In nonstandard analysis, a field of mathematics, the increment theorem states the following: Suppose a function  is differentiable at  and that  is infinitesimal. Then

for some infinitesimal , where

If  then we may write

A similar theorem exists in standard Calculus.  Again assume that  is differentiable, but now let  be a nonzero standard real number. Then the same equation

See also 
Nonstandard calculus
Elementary Calculus: An Infinitesimal Approach
Abraham Robinson
Taylor's theorem

References 
 Howard Jerome Keisler: Elementary Calculus: An Infinitesimal Approach. First edition 1976; 2nd edition 1986. This book is now out of print. The publisher has reverted the copyright to the author, who has made available the 2nd edition in .pdf format available for downloading at http://www.math.wisc.edu/~keisler/calc.html

Calculus
Nonstandard analysis